Cupressus nevadensis, now reclassified as Hesperocyparis nevadensis, with the common name Paiute cypress, is a species of cypress tree native to a small area in Sierra Nevada of California, in the western United States.

Distribution
The Paiute cypress grows in a small area of the Southern Sierra Nevada, within Kern County, California and Tulare County. It is found in pinyon/juniper and oak/pine woodlands, chaparral, and closed-cone-cypress forest habitats.
 
The largest grove composed primarily of the species is located south of the town of Bodfish in the Lake Isabella region. There are eight or so other populations of much smaller, scattered stands in the Southern Sierras.

Description 
Hesperocyparis nevadensis is a medium-sized evergreen tree with a conic crown, growing to heights of 10–25 m (exceptionally to 39 m), and a trunk diameter of up to 0.5 m (exceptionally to 1 m). The foliage grows in sparse, very fragrant, sprays varying from dull gray-green to glaucous blue-green in color. The leaves are scale-like, highly glandular, resinous and aromatic, 2–5 mm long, and produced on rounded (not flattened) shoots.

The seed cones are globose to oblong, 25–55 mm long, with 6 or 8 (rarely 4 or 10) scales, green to brown at first, maturing gray or gray-brown about 20–24 months after pollination. The male cones are 3–5 mm long, and release pollen in February–March.

The cones often remain closed for several years, only opening after the parent tree is killed in a wildfire, thereby allowing the seeds to colonize the bare ground exposed by the natural fire.

Conservation
Like most California cypress, it is a pyrophyte, heavily reliant on wildfire for its regeneration.   Fire suppression policies of the past decades have severely limited reproduction of this fire dependent species.  It is on the IUCN Red List as an endangered species.

Taxonomy
It has been reclassified in the genus Hesperocyparis, with other former Cupressus species native to western North America. It was also previously included as a subspecies within Cupressus arizonica, Cupressus arizonica subsp. nevadensis. USDA: Hesperocyparis nevadensis synonyms;  Cupressus arizonica subsp. nevadensis . accessed 8.28.2015

See also
Fire ecology

References

External links

CalFlora Database: Hesperocyparis nevadensis (Paiute cypress)
USDA Plants Profile for Hesperocyparis nevadenss (Paiute cypress)
Jepson Manual eFlora: Hesperocyparis nevadensis
UC Photos Gallery: Hesperocyparis nevadensis (formerly Cupressus nevadensis) 
Gymnosperm Database: Cupressus nevadensis

nevadensis
Endemic flora of California
Flora of the Sierra Nevada (United States)
Trees of the Southwestern United States
Natural history of the California chaparral and woodlands
Natural history of Kern County, California
Natural history of Tulare County, California
Taxobox binomials not recognized by IUCN